The Bandits/Los Bandidos is a 1967 Mexican/American international co-production starring Robert Conrad who co-wrote and co-directed the film with the producer Alfredo Zacarías. The film was shot in Mexico in 1966 during a hiatus of Conrad's The Wild Wild West television series but the film was not released in the US until May 1979.

Several of the crew such as cinematographer Ted Voigtlander, stunt director Whitey Hughes, co-editor Grant K. Smith and co-producers James M. George and Harry Harvey Jr. worked with Robert Conrad on The Wild Wild West.

Plot
Three Americans drifting through Mexico find themselves caught up in the French intervention in Mexico.

Cast
Robert Conrad as Chris Barrett
Roy Jenson as Josh Racker
Jan-Michael Vincent as Taye 'Boy' Brown
Manuel López Ochoa as Valdez 
Pedro Armendáriz Jr. as Priest 
María Duval as Señora Valdez

Notes

External links
 

1967 films
1967 Western (genre) films
American Western (genre) films
Mexican Western (genre) films
1960s English-language films
English-language Mexican films
Second French intervention in Mexico films
Films shot in Mexico
Films set in Mexico
1960s American films
1960s Mexican films